The Saudi British Bank (SABB) is a Riyadh-based Saudi joint stock company in which British banking firm HSBC Holdings PLC owns a minority stake. The bank traces its origins to the British Bank of the Middle East which was acquired by HSBC in 1959. In response to restrictions on foreign ownership of banks in Saudi Arabia, SABB was created in 1978 to manage HSBC branches and assets in the country.

SABB is one of the five largest Saudi banks by deposits and has over eighty branches across Saudi Arabia and one branch in London, England. In May 2018, prompted by recent changes to Vision 2030 economic reforms, SABB announced its intention to acquire Alawwal Bank in the Saudi banking sector's first merger in twenty years.

History

British Bank of Iran and the Middle East (1950) 
The British Bank of Iran and the Middle East, which became British Bank of the Middle East (BBME), opened branches in Jeddah and Al Khobar in 1950.  The Jeddah branch in particular depended for its profits on the Hajj, the Muslim pilgrimage to Makkah (Mecca). Hongkong and Shanghai Banking Corporation (HSBC) acquired BBME in 1959.

Saudi British Bank (1976) 
In 1976 the central bank enacted its sweeping policy of banking sector Saudization to address foreign banks' domination of the sector and its impact on the Saudi economy. Consequently, it directed all foreign bank branches to incorporate in Saudi Arabia (i.e., become Saudi companies with Saudi capital) and limited their parent companies to ownership of forty percent of these new entities.

As a result, HSBC incorporated in Saudi Arabia in 1978 and opened up to local ownership, renaming itself the Saudi British Bank. Ownership became 60% Saudi and 40% HSBC, and HSBC has a technical services agreement with the bank.

HSBC Holdings of Britain held 49% stake in the joint venture with SABB holding 51% until October 2019 when HSBC Group acquired shares from SABB to become the major shareholder with 51% stake.

Merger with Alawwal Bank (2019)
On May 16, 2018, SABB and Alawwal Bank (formerly Saudi Hollandi Bank) entered into a non-binding agreement on a deal for SABB to acquire Alawwal. The agreement concluded  nearly one year of negotiations, and SABB will be represented by U.S. investment bank Goldman Sachs in the transaction. Alawwal Bank will cease to exist as a legal entity and will be absorbed into SABB, creating Saudi Arabia's third largest bank with a market cap of $17.2 billion. 

SABB shareholders will own 73 percent of the new bank, which is expected to be chaired by Saudi businesswoman Lubna Al Olayan. Final agreement on a merger deal was announced one week after the Saudi government launched the Financial Sector Development Program, an executive program aimed at overhauling the Saudi financial sector to create an effective capital market capable of supporting the goals of the Vision 2030 economic reform plans.

The merger of the two banks was completed on 16 June 2019. The integration of the two banks was planned to completed in about 18 months.

The integration was planned to completely took place in about 18 months, which will result in retention of the brand name "Saudi British Bank" only.

On 14 March 2021, Alawwal & SABB fully integrated in historic bank merger.

Services
SABB offers services in investment banking, commercial banking, private banking and Islamic banking. SABB Islamic Financial Solutions (Arabic: الحلول المالية الإسلامية), which are part of SABB services, are regulated by the Saudi Arabian Monetary Agency and a Sharia Supervisory Committee. This ensures that SABB Islamic Financial Solutions conforms to strict adherence to principles of Sharia.

Credit rating
In August 2011, Fitch Ratings gave SABB's long-term issuer default rating (IDR) at “A” with a stable outlook as well as The Viability Rating (VR) has also been affirmed at “A”.

In October 2018, in anticipation of its pending merger with Alawwal Bank, Moody’s reaffirmed local and foreign currency deposit ratings of SABB at A1/P-1 and Alawwal Bank at A3/P-2, respectively.

See also

 HSBC Bank Middle East
 British Arab Commercial Bank
 Abdullah Mohammed Al-Hugail
 List of companies of Saudi Arabia
 List of banks in Saudi Arabia

References

External links

HSBC Peru

Companies listed on Tadawul
Companies based in Riyadh
Banks of Saudi Arabia
HSBC
1978 establishments in Saudi Arabia
Banks established in 1978
Saudi Arabia–United Kingdom relations